Siddananjappa Mallikarjunaiah (1931 – 2014) was an Indian politician. He represented the Tumkur constituency of Karnataka in Lok Sabha thrice, and was a member of the Bharatiya Janata Party (BJP).

He was Deputy Speaker of Lok-sabha in the Tenth Lok Sabha (1991–1996). He was elected to the Lok Sabha thrice from Tumkur in 1991, 1998 and 2004. He lost Lok Sabha election from Tumkur four times, in 1977, 1980, 1996, 1999. He started his political career as an MLC representing Tumkur on the Karnataka Legislative Council from 19711991 for Jana Sangh, Janata Party, and Bharatiya Janata Party. He also served as the Deputy Chairman of the council from 19801986. He was the State President of the Jana Sangh.

He was born in Tumkur on 26 June 1931. He died on 13 March 2014 in Tumkur at the age of 82 from a heart attack.

References

External links
 Members of Fourteenth Lok Sabha - Parliament of India website

(1991-1996)

1931 births
2014 deaths
People from Tumkur
Bharatiya Jana Sangh politicians
Bharatiya Janata Party politicians from Karnataka
Deputy Speakers of the Lok Sabha
India MPs 1991–1996
India MPs 1998–1999
India MPs 2004–2009
Lok Sabha members from Karnataka
Members of the Karnataka Legislative Council
Janata Party politicians